Tessaradomidae is a family of bryozoans belonging to the order Cheilostomatida.

Genera

Genera:
 Beisselina Canu, 1913
 Pachydermopora Gordon, 2002
 Pachythecella Bassler, 1934

References

Cheilostomatida